Ali Barlas, also known as Ali Çavlum (1869 – 15 March 1953) was a Turkish politician of liberal signature, who was an official of the Freedom and Accord Party. He later joined the CHP when the Turkish Republic was proclaimed.

References 

1869 births
1953 deaths
Place of death missing
Politicians from Istanbul
Republican People's Party (Turkey) politicians